Leadfoot may refer to:
 Leadfoot (band), a musical group
 Leadfoot (Transformers), a Transformers character
 Leadfoot (video game), a 2001 video game